gameswf (pronounced "game swiff") is an open-source public domain library for parsing and rendering SWF movies, using 3D hardware APIs for rendering. It is designed to be used as a UI library for video games.

It is written in C++, and compiles under Microsoft Windows, OS X, Linux, iOS and Android, using GCC and MSVC. It includes code for rendering with OpenGL ES. The rendering module is factored out so that the code can be ported to other APIs.

gameswf is used by other open source projects such as Gnash. It is also used in Oddworld: Stranger's Wrath and many Gameloft games to display user interface screens and menus such as the player's inventory.

gameswf is a prototype of Scaleform GFx, advanced cross-platform GUI solution.

References

External links
 
 Realtime video compositing software using gameswf

Adobe Flash
Free software programmed in C++
Graphics-related software for Linux
MacOS graphics software
MacOS programming tools
Public-domain software with source code
Windows graphics-related software